The highest-selling albums and EPs in the United States are ranked in the Billboard 200, published by Billboard magazine. The data are compiled by Nielsen Soundscan based on each album's weekly physical and digital sales.

25 acts achieved number one albums during this year with artist such as Nelly and Shania Twain who had their albums debut at number one on the chart. Rapper Eminem's The Eminem Show is the best selling album of 2002 selling over approximately 7.6 million copies by the end of the year. It is also the longest running album of 2002 spending six non-consecutive weeks the chart and was known for its first full week of sales debut of 1.322 million copies which Nielsen SoundScan scanned as the then sixth largest sales of all time in its first week.  

The band Creed continued its eight week long run on the chart but is credited as the longest running album for 2001. Jennifer Lopez earned her second number one album on the charts with J to tha L-O!: The Remixes, which became the highest first week sales of a remix album at the time. R&B artist Ashanti earned her first number one album with her self-titled debut album Ashanti, which opened up with first week sales of 503,000 copies in its first week alone. Puff Daddy earned his first number one album since No Way Out back in 1997. Rapper Jay-Z earned his fifth chart topper with The Blueprint 2: The Gift & The Curse, which opened up with first week sales of 545,000 copies alone. Heavy metal band Disturbed earned its first number one album on the chart with Believe, which opened up with first week sales of 284,000 copies alone.

Country music singer Shania Twain's album Up! opened up with a huge first week sales of 857,000 copies in its first week alone, giving her the recognition of the highest first week sales of her career and second highest of the year, only behind Eminem's The Eminem Show and at the time the fastest selling solo female album ever. Nelly's album Nellyville opened up with his highest first week sales of his career which logged on with huge sales of 714,000 copies in its first week alone, which beat his sales of his debut album Country Grammar, which opened up with first week sales of 235,000 copies. Country singer Alan Jackson album Drive gave him his first number one album on the chart and opened up with first week sales of 211,000 copies.

Chart history

See also
2002 in music

References

2002
United States albums